Alfred Reingoldovich Kokh (Koch) (born 28 February 1961)  is a Russian statesman, writer, mathematician-economist, and businessman. From 12 September 1996 to 13 August 1997 and from 17 March 1997 to 13 August 1997, he was the head of the Federal Agency for State Property Management and a deputy prime minister of Russia under Viktor Chernomyrdin, respectively.

Education and early life

He was born in the Kazakh Soviet Socialist Republic to an ethnically German father who was deported there in 1941 and an ethnic Russian mother.

During the beginning of the construction of the Volzhsky Automobile Plant, he and his parents then moved to Tolyatti where his father became the head of the department of related industries, a structure that dealt with all the component parts.

Career

He served as a deputy prime minister under President Boris Yeltsin and was an ally of economic reformer Anatoly Chubais, a chief architect of Russia's privatization. On 12 September 1996, Kokh was appointed head of Russia's State Property Committee, acting as Russia's privatization chief. He left the position on 13 August 1997, after the privatization auctions (loans-for-shares).

In June 2000, Alfred Kokh became head of Gazprom-Media, a subsidiary media holding of Gazprom (now a subsidiary holding of Gazprombank), and oversaw the gas giant's controversial takeover of NTV, an independent television company owned by Vladimir Gusinsky, on which he hosted the game show Алчность, the Russian version of Greed.

He was succeeded by Boris Jordan on 16 October 2001. He also served as head of the 2003 election campaign staff for the Union of Right Forces, a pro-business, democratic party of young reformers including Yegor Gaidar, Boris Nemtsov and Irina Khakamada, the first woman to run for the Russian presidency.

He wrote the 2006 Russian book A Crate of Vodka (Ящик водки), a dialogue with journalist Igor Svinarenko about the twenty-year period that covered the last Soviet generation and the first, free Russian generation (1982, the death of Leonid Brezhnev, to 2001, when 9/11 put an end to liberal politics). The English translation appeared in spring 2009.

In 2008, he financed a scholarly point-by-point refutation of Holocaust denial materials. Denial of the Denial (Отрицание отрицания), with Pavel Polian, is the first book on the subject published in Russia.

Kokh is a frequent commentator in Medved, a glossy Russian men's magazine, writing about history and travel.

Alfred Koch (or Kokh) was a sponsor of the new monument in Moscow to Tsar Alexander II, the leader who emancipated the serfs and reformed the Russian army. Out of fear of persecution by the Russian authorities he fled to Germany in June 2014. He lives on Lake Chiemsee in Rosenheim, Bavaria. His daughter Olga (born 1992, St Petersburg) attended The American School in England at Thorpe, Surrey beginning at age 13 and is a stand-up comedian living in central London.

References

External links
Biography (in Russian)
Koch without a bacillus by Andrei Agafonov (in Russian).
On the arguments about the "Europeanness" of Russia, a lecture by Alfred Kokh, June 23, 2005 (in Russian).
One more member of the family of the civilized nations by Alfred Kokh, Polit.ru, February 9, 2005 (in Russian).
Transcript of presentation of Denial of the Denial book (in Russian)
 Video of the Denial of the Denial presentation at Polit.ru

Russian people of German descent
1961 births
Living people
Russian media executives
Deputy heads of government of the Russian Federation
Saint Petersburg University of Economics and Finance alumni
People from East Kazakhstan Region
People from Tolyatti